Lào Cai station is a railway station in Vietnam.
It serves the border town of Lào Cai, in Lào Cai Province. Several passenger trains a day run between Hanoi and Lao Cai.

Lao Cai Station is the last station of the Hanoi–Lao Cai railway, the Vietnamese section of the meter-gauge Kunming–Hai Phong Railway. North of Lao Cai Station, the railway continues, crossing the Nanxi River into China, but it carries only freight trains, and no passenger service.

References

Buildings and structures in Lào Cai province
Railway stations in Vietnam